SS Maplewood was a steamer that served during World War I. She was torpedoed and sunk in the Mediterranean Sea 47 nautical miles (87 km) south west of Cape Sperone, Sardinia, Italy by SM U-35 on 7 April 1917.

References

Ships sunk by German submarines in World War I
1915 ships